Prali (french: Praly) is a comune (municipality) in the Metropolitan City of Turin in the Italian region Piedmont, located about  southwest of Turin, on the border with France.

Prali borders the following municipalities: Abriès (France), Angrogna, Bobbio Pellice, Perrero, Pragelato, Salza di Pinerolo, Sauze di Cesana, and Villar Pellice.

Twin towns — sister cities
Prali is twinned with:

  Abriès, France

References

Cities and towns in Piedmont